Parotis prasinalis is a moth of the family Crambidae. It is found in Madagascar, Mozambique, Comoros, Seychelles and in  Kenya.

This species has a wingspan of 17mm. The wings are clear-grassgreen with a black spot in their middle. Antennae are yellowish, with almost the length of the forewings. The edge of the forewings and palpae are grey-brown.

References

Moths described in 1880
Spilomelinae
Moths of the Comoros
Moths of Madagascar
Moths of Seychelles
Moths of Sub-Saharan Africa
Lepidoptera of Kenya
Lepidoptera of Mozambique